Ennomos is a genus of moths in the family Geometridae erected by Georg Friedrich Treitschke in 1825.

Species
 Ennomos alniaria (Linnaeus, 1758) – canary-shouldered thorn
 Ennomos autumnaria (Werneburg, 1859) – large thorn
 Ennomos effractaria (Freyer, 1842)
 Ennomos erosaria (Denis & Schiffermüller, 1775) – September thorn
 Ennomos fraxineti Wiltshire, 1947
 Ennomos fuscantaria (Haworth, 1809) – dusky thorn
 Ennomos infidelis Prout, 1929
 Ennomos magnaria Guenée, 1857 – maple spanworm, notched wing, notched-wing geometer, or notch-wing moth
 Ennomos quercaria (Hübner, 1813) – clouded August thorn
 Ennomos quercinaria (Hufnagel, 1767) – August thorn
 Ennomos subsignaria (Hübner, 1823) – elm spanworm

References

Ennomini
Taxa named by Georg Friedrich Treitschke